The Dominican Summer League Brewers are a Minor League Baseball team of the Dominican Summer League (DSL) and a Rookie affiliate of the Milwaukee Brewers. They are located in Ramón Santana, San Pedro de Macorís, Dominican Republic, and play their home games at the Tower Complex. 

The Milwaukee Brewers began fielding teams in the Dominican Summer League in 1989, though several teams were operated as co-ops in partnership with other Major League Baseball clubs. The DSL Brewers have played continuously since 2010 following previous stretches from 1991 to 1993 and 1997 to 2003. Milwaukee currently operates two DSL teams: the DSL Brewers 1 and DSL Brewers 2.

The Brewers won their lone DSL championship in 2001.

History
The Milwaukee Brewers entered the Dominican Summer League (DSL) in 1989 as part of a co-op team shared with the Boston Red Sox and Baltimore Orioles. In 1990, they ran a co-op with the Toronto Blue Jays. The Brewers had their first solo DSL team for three seasons from 1991 to 1993. They reverted to the co-op approach after this stretch, partnering with the Houston Astros in 1994 and 1995 and with the Chicago White Sox in 1996.

From 1997 to 2003, the Brewers once again operated their own team. The 2000 club reached the championship finals but lost to the DSL Dodgers, 3–2. The 2001 DSL Brewers, managed by Mike Guerrero, won the DSL championship versus the DSL Phillies, 3–2.

Milwaukee left the DSL after the 2003 campaign and did not return until 2009 in partnership with Baltimore. They fielded their own squad from 2010 to 2016. The 2011 DSL Brewers qualified for the playoffs with a wild card berth but were eliminated in the first round by the DSL Orioles, 2–1.

Since 2012, the DSL Brewers have operated out of the Tower Complex in Ramón Santana. Built in 2006, the facility is owned and operated by former Milwaukee closer Salomón Torres and was previously home to the Texas Rangers' Dominican operations.

From 2017 to 2019, the Brewers partnered with the Cleveland Indians to field a second team in addition to their own. They planned to have a co-op team with Toronto in 2020, but the season was cancelled due to the COVID-19 pandemic. Since 2021, Milwaukee has operated two DSL teams: Brewers 1 and Brewers 2.

Season-by-season records

Rosters

References

1989 establishments in the Dominican Republic
Baseball teams established in 1989
Baseball teams in the Dominican Republic
Dominican Summer League teams
Milwaukee Brewers minor league affiliates